The K-On! animated television series is based on the manga series of the same name written and illustrated by Kakifly. The episodes, produced by the animation studio Kyoto Animation, are directed by Naoko Yamada, written by Reiko Yoshida, and features character design by Yukiko Horiguchi who based the designs on Kakifly's original concept. The story follows four Japanese high school girls who join their school's light music club to try to save it from being abolished. However, they are the only four members of the club, one of which has little experience with guitar playing.

Thirteen episodes were broadcast on TBS between April 3 and June 26, 2009. The episodes began airing on subsequent networks at later dates which include BS-TBS, MBS, and CBC. The widescreen version aired on BS-TBS between April 25 and July 18, 2009. Seven BD/DVD compilation volumes were released by Pony Canyon between July 29, 2009 and January 20, 2010. An additional original video animation episode was released with the final BD/DVD volume on January 20, 2010. Both an English-subtitled and English-dubbed version by Red Angel Media began airing on March 16, 2010 on Animax Asia. At their industry panel at Anime Expo 2010, anime distributor Bandai Entertainment announced that they have acquired the first season of K-On! for a BD/DVD release. A second season titled K-On!! (with two exclamation marks) aired in Japan between April 7, 2010 and September 28, 2010 with 26 episodes. The episodes aired in HD format in Japan. An OVA episode was included with the ninth BD/DVD volume of the second season released on March 16, 2011. An English dubbed version of this season began airing on Animax Asia starting October 20, 2010. The second season was licensed by Sentai Filmworks and released in two BD/DVD collections in North America between June and August 2012. An animated film based on the series was released in Japanese theaters on December 3, 2011, and was later released on BD and DVD on July 18, 2012. Sentai Filmworks released the film in North America on May 21, 2013.

Two pieces of theme music are used for the first season; one opening theme and one ending theme. The opening theme is "Cagayake! Girls" by Aki Toyosaki with Yōko Hikasa, Satomi Satō and Minako Kotobuki. The ending theme is "Don't Say Lazy" by Hikasa with Toyosaki, Satō and Kotobuki. From episode nine, the opening video features Azusa, and also features some minor changes to the music, particularly an additional guitar part during certain segments (alongside the initial two). Four pieces of theme music are used for the second season; two opening themes and two ending themes. For the first 13 episodes, the opening theme is "Go! Go! Maniac" and the ending theme is "Listen!!". For episodes 14 onwards, the opening theme is "Utauyo!! Miracle" while the ending theme is "No, Thank You!". The songs from the second season are performed by Toyosaki, Hikasa, Satō, Kotobuki, and Ayana Taketatsu, with Toyosaki and Hikasa singing lead vocals on the opening and ending themes, respectively.

Episode list

K-On! (2009)

Ura-On!
A recap episode showing all the performances from the first season aired on July 25, 2009. A series of three-minute shorts entitled 'Ura-On!' were included on DVD and Blu-ray Disc volumes.

K-On!! (2010)

Ura-On!!

Film (2011)

References

External links
Anime official website 

K-On!